Jean Georgescu (25 February 1904 – 8 April 1994) was a Romanian film director, actor, and screenwriter. Born in Bucharest, Romania (where he also died), he was most notable for directing films including In Our Village (1951, in collaboration with Victor Iliu).

Biography 
With the support of the operator Nicolae Barbelian, he made his first film, Millionaire for a Day.

He was awarded the Order of Cultural Merit class I (1971) "for special merits in the work of building socialism, on the occasion of the 50th anniversary of the founding of the Romanian Communist Party."

References

External links
http://www.allocine.fr/personne/fichepersonne_gen_cpersonne=509344.html
http://www.imdb.com/name/nm0313695/
 Cinemagia - Jean Georgescu
 Un secol de cinema. Maestrii. Jean Georgescu. Arhiva TVR.
 Aniversare Jean Georgescu. Canalul All About Romanian Cinema
 Omagiu Jean Georgescu. Universitatea Hyperion

Biographies (in Romanian)
 Vă mai amintiți de: Jean Georgescu, 6 April 2010, Eliza Zdru, Adevărul
 108 ani de la nașterea marelui regizor Jean Georgescu, 25 februarie 2012, Libertatea

Film people from Bucharest
1904 births
1994 deaths
Romanian film directors
Romanian male film actors
Romanian male silent film actors
Romanian screenwriters
20th-century screenwriters